Lentz House (Hotel Sheller) is a historic hotel located at North Manchester, Wabash County, Indiana.  It was built in 1881, and is a -story, rectangular, Second Empire style brick building. The third story was added in 1896 and attached to the main building is a two-story frame wing built in 1847.  It has a mansard roof with dormers and features a wraparound porch.

It was listed on the National Register of Historic Places in 1982.

References

Hotel buildings on the National Register of Historic Places in Indiana
Second Empire architecture in Indiana
Hotel buildings completed in 1881
Buildings and structures in Wabash County, Indiana
National Register of Historic Places in Wabash County, Indiana
1881 establishments in Indiana